Gironniera, is a genus of deciduous trees, containing six recognized species. It is widespread in tropical countries.

Species
Gironniera celtidifolia Gaudich.
Gironniera hirta Ridl.	
Gironniera nervosa Planch.	
Gironniera parvifolia Planch.	
Gironniera rhamnifolia Blume	
Gironniera subaequalis Planch.

Fossil record
†Gironniera carinata fossil seeds of the Chattian stage, Oligocene, are known from the Oberleichtersbach Formation in the Rhön Mountains, central Germany.

References

 http://www.theplantlist.org/browse/A/Cannabaceae/Gironniera/
 http://www.efloras.org/florataxon.aspx?flora_id=2&taxon_id=113576

Cannabaceae
Rosales genera